Amazonesia is a genus of harvestmen in the family Sclerosomatidae.

Species
 Amazonesia quadriprocessigera H.E.M.Soares, 1970
 Amazonesia pulchra H.E.M.Soares, 1970

References

Harvestman genera
Fauna of the Amazon
Sclerosomatidae